Jamestown, also known as Webersvallei ("Weber's Valley"), is a quiet rural settlement on the southern outskirts of Stellenbosch in the Cape Winelands District of the Western Cape province of South Africa. It is situated next to Blaauwklippen Vineyards, on the eastern side of route R44 from Stellenbosch to Somerset West and the Strand coastal resort. The main access from the R44 is via Webersvallei Road, the main road in Jamestown with watererven – long, narrow agricultural plots on the south bank of Blouklip River – on the north side of the road and residential plots on the south side of the road.

History
Over time, Jamestown has transformed from a subsistence farming village into a primarily residential area as residents have sought work elsewhere in order to survive. A heritage committee was established in 2010 to document the history of Jamestown for the benefit of future generations, to restore old buildings and to facilitate increased involvement in local festivals and commemorative events.

The village was named after James Rattray (1859–1938), a Stellenbosch businessman who owned a butchery in Dorp Street. He was the grandson of Scottish teacher James Rattray (c. 1795–1864) who immigrated to the Cape Colony in 1822, one of several British people recruited to the colony by Scottish missionary George Thom at the request of the governor Lord Charles Somerset. In 1902 Rattray and Rhenish missionary Jacob Weber (1856–1937), who was born in Lennep in Germany and sent to Stellenbosch in 1882, acquired a portion of the Blaauwklippen farm. The land was divided into plots and sold to coloured families, and most of the associated debt was paid off within twenty years. Street names such as Everbearing, Festival, Nared, Pajaro, Rolinda, Tiobelle, Titan, Torrey, Tribute and Whiteheart in the residential area are based on strawberry varieties, after the main crop grown there since 1902. Other crops grown there include beans, lettuce, potatoes and tomatoes.

Despite Weber's role in the establishment of Jamestown, it is not a mission station per se. The Rhenish Mission Church built in 1823 is situated next to Die Braak, the common in the Stellenbosch town centre. A small church was inaugurated in Jamestown in 1923, which initially also served as a school for the area. Some of the villagers served in the Second World War. In 1946 JGC Williams opened the General Dealer in Webersvallei Road, which closed its doors in 2012 when his sons retired. Jamestown was designated a coloured area under apartheid segregation laws, and the majority of the residents were not subjected to forced removals. The 1970s saw the first tarred road and the arrival of electricity for those who could afford it. Dominoes were traditionally played by the men in the village. The Burnley soccer club established in 1932 and the Young Gardens soccer club in 1940 merged in 1973 to form Jamestown Aurora Athletic Football Club. Jamestown has a long musical tradition which is a source of community pride. Christmas is a particularly busy time for the Jamestown Christian string orchestra established in 1967, which was preceded by the Jamestown tickey band.

Amenities and further development
Jamestown was incorporated into the greater Stellenbosch Municipality in 1994.

Today Jamestown has several churches, two government schools – Weber Gedenk Primary School and Stellenzicht Secondary School, pre-primary childcare facilities, a public health clinic, a café and postal agency, a library, a communal sports ground, and a cemetery. These amenities also cater for people living on wine farms in the area. The Marie Stander School of Art was established in Jamestown in 2000. In 2001 the Usiko Youth Development Project was launched in conjunction with Stellenbosch University's Psychology Department to address the needs of at-risk youth in Jamestown. Jamestown Golf Club was established in 2001 and is affiliated with three nearby golf clubs. Jamestown Sounds, a community outreach project teaching local children music, was founded in 2005. Weber Gedenk Primary School has two percussion bands, and the senior choir at the school participates in local choir festivals.

Post apartheid the area has experienced considerable rezoning and property development, although it has been targeted primarily at the luxury real estate market and is not well integrated with the original residential area. Such developments include De Zalze Winelands Golf Estate on the opposite side of the R44, Stellenbosch Square shopping centre and La Clémence retirement village at the R44 entrance to Jamestown, Blaauwklip Office Park next to Stellenbosch Square, and Aan de Weber residential development at the end of Webersvallei Road. Donford BMW, a world-class car and motorcycle dealership is also located in Jamestown.

The area has also seen the growth of informal settlements inhabited by agricultural labourers who work on surrounding farms and their families. Despite these developments, the residents of Jamestown are described as an integrated, close-knit community with a variety of people living together in harmony.

Notable people from Jamestown
Cyril Jooste – Mayor of Stellenbosch (December 2009 - June 2011)
Keenan Davidse – professional golfer
Joyene Isaacs – head of the Western Cape Department of Agriculture (appointed January 2002)
Marie Stander – figurative and portrait artist

Notes and references

External links

Stellenbosch
Populated places in the Stellenbosch Local Municipality
Populated places established in 1902
1902 establishments in the Cape Colony